Vesna is a Slavic female name derived from the name of Vesna, an ancient Slavic goddess of spring. It means "spring" in some Slavic languages. It is in use in Croatia, North Macedonia, Serbia, Bosnia and Herzegovina, Montenegro and Slovenia. It is also given in Russia, Ukraine, Bulgaria, the Czech Republic, and Slovakia. It rarely appears in Poland (as Wiosna, Wesna, and Vesna).

In Croatia, the name Vesna was the second most common feminine given name between 1960 and 1969, while appearing among the most common ones in two earlier decades as well.

People named Vesna
Vesna Čitaković (born 1979), Serbian volleyball player
Vesna Dolonc (born 1989), Serbian tennis player
Vesna Györkös Žnidar (born 1977), Slovenian politician
Vesna Jovanovic (born 1976), American visual artist
Vesna Krmpotić (1932–2018), Croatian writer and translator
Vesna Milačić Kaja (born 1968), Montenegrin singer
Vesna Milanović-Litre (born 1986), Croatian handball player
Vesna Milošević (born 1955), Yugoslav handball player
Vesna Mišanović (born 1964), Bosnian chess player
Vesna Pešić (born 1940), Serbian politician and sociologist
Vesna Pisarović (born 1978), Croatian singer
Vesna Pusić (born 1953), Croatian politician and sociologist
Vesna Radović (born 1954), Yugoslav/Austrian handball player
Vesna Rožič (1987–2013), Slovenian chess player
Vesna Škare-Ožbolt (born 1961), Croatian politician
Vesna Teršelič (born 1962), Croatian peace activist
Vesna Trivalić (born 1965), Serbian actress
Vesna Vulović (1950–2016), Serbian flight attendant
Vesna Zmijanac (born 1957), Serbian singer

Fictional people named Vesna 
Vesna, a character from the movie Loners.
 Vesna in Alien Nation.
Vesna, a character from the game The Witcher.

See also
 Slavic names

References

Bosnian feminine given names
Bulgarian feminine given names
Serbian feminine given names
Croatian feminine given names
Macedonian feminine given names
Slovene feminine given names
Czech feminine given names
Slovak feminine given names
Russian feminine given names
Ukrainian feminine given names